Alexander House is a grade II* listed house at High Street, Corsham, Wiltshire, England. It dates from the early eighteenth century and is ashlar fronted with stone tiled roofs. The building was the Corsham maternity home from about 1913 to 1950.

References 

Georgian architecture in Wiltshire
Grade II* listed buildings in Wiltshire
Corsham
Grade II* listed houses
Buildings and structures completed in the 18th century